Dana Malone (October 8, 1857 – August 14, 1917) was an American politician who served as a member of the Massachusetts House of Representatives from 1893 to 1894 and a member of the Massachusetts Senate from 1895 to 1896, District Attorney for the Northwest District from 1901 to 1905, and Massachusetts Attorney General from 1906 to 1911.

As District Attorney, Malone was responsible for the prosecution of Euclid Madden, a motorman who upset the carriage of President Theodore Roosevelt and caused the death of William Craig, the first United States Secret Service agent to die in the line of duty.

Malone died on August 14, 1917 in Greenfield, Massachusetts after being thrown from a horse and fracturing his skull.

References

1857 births
1917 deaths
Massachusetts lawyers
Massachusetts Attorneys General
Massachusetts Republicans
People from Arcade, New York
People from Greenfield, Massachusetts
19th-century American politicians
19th-century American lawyers